Aristotelia molestella is a moth of the family Gelechiidae. It was described by Zeller in 1873. It is found in North America, where it has been recorded from Texas.

References

Moths described in 1873
Aristotelia (moth)
Moths of North America